Laura Manuela Moise (born 11 October 1976) is a Romanian judoka. She competed in the women's extra-lightweight event at the 2000 Summer Olympics.

References

External links
 

1976 births
Living people
Romanian female judoka
Olympic judoka of Romania
Judoka at the 2000 Summer Olympics
People from Onești
20th-century Romanian women
21st-century Romanian women